Mr. Sunshine is an American television sitcom that aired from February 9 to April 6, 2011, as a mid-season replacement. The single-camera comedy was co-created by Matthew Perry, who also starred in the series. ABC cancelled the series on May 13, 2011, due to low ratings.

Premise
Ben Donovan (Perry) is the operations manager for the Sunshine Center, a second-tier arena in San Diego, who has to deal with the unusual demands of his job and his unpredictable boss (Allison Janney).

Cast and characters

Main cast
Matthew Perry as Ben Donovan – manager of the Sunshine Center
Allison Janney as Crystal Cohen – Ben's unpredictable boss
Andrea Anders as Alice – Ben's former "friend with benefits" now dating Alonzo
James Lesure as Alonzo Pope – former NBA star, Ben's happy-go-lucky co-worker and Alice's boyfriend
Nate Torrence as Roman Cohen – Crystal's lovable but weird son. He has a crush on Heather

Recurring cast
Portia Doubleday as Heather – Ben's assistant, whom everyone believes is crazy

Development and production
Mr. Sunshine is based on a concept by Matthew Perry, who planned to co-write, star in, and executive produce. The project sparked a bidding war among the networks, with ABC landing the comedy in October 2009. The deal came with hefty penalties for ABC if the pilot hadn't made it to series. Perry teamed with Sony writers Alex Barnow and Marc Firek to pen the script.

A green light to produce the pilot came from ABC in early January 2010. Thomas Schlamme, of Shoe Money Productions, was chosen to direct the half-hour pilot. Perry, Schlamme, and co-writers Barnow and Firek were all listed as executive producers for the pilot, along with Jamie Tarses of FanFare Productions.

Casting began in late January, with Allison Janney as the first actor added to the cast as Ben's boss. In February, Andrea Anders was tapped as Ben's "friend with benefits", and Nate Torrence brought on board to play Roman, the son of Ben's boss. The casting of Portia Doubleday as Ben's assistant, and James Lesure as an ex-basketball star, was announced at the end of April.

In May 2010, ABC picked up the pilot for the 2010–2011 television season.

On May 13, 2011, ABC announced that it had canceled Mr. Sunshine.

Episodes

Home media
The series was released on DVD on November 1, 2011, featuring the 4 unaired episodes.

Mill Creek Entertainment announced the re-released of the complete series on DVD.

Reception 
On Rotten Tomatoes, the series has an aggregate score of 52% based on 14 positive and 13 negative critic reviews.  The website’s consensus reads: "Thanks to the willing slapstick antics of a solid ensemble cast, Mr. Sunshine has potential -- although for what, it's difficult to tell." The show scored a 54% rating on Metacritic.

References

External links

2010s American single-camera sitcoms
2011 American television series debuts
2011 American television series endings
American Broadcasting Company original programming
English-language television shows
Television series by Sony Pictures Television
Television shows set in San Diego